Big Up Clash was the second release of ska punk bands Shootin' Goon and Lubby Nugget Featuring five tracks from Goon, with influences ranging from punk rock to traditional ska and rocksteady, including a cover version of Lubby Nugget's "Flesh Pimp". Huddersfield's Lubby Nugget also supplied five songs including two thrash punk style songs and the reggae live favourite "Cheeky Little Number" as well as supplying a cover version of Shootin' Goon's "Plain To See" and a Dub mix of their track "SDW" entitled "S.D. Dub L.U."

Track listing
Shootin' Goon

 "Victim to Yourself"
 "Boss Man"
 "Road Tripped"
 "Pen 15"
 "Flesh Pimp" Cover of Lubby Nugget's track off their album 'Subtle Crucial'

Lubby Nugget
 X 3 + 1
 A Cheeky Little Number
(Theme from) an Evil Man's Funeral
 Plain To See"- Cover of a Shootin' Goon track originally on Splottside Rocksteady
 S.D. Dub L.U.

External links
myspace.com/shootingoon
Moon Ska Europe profile of Shootin' Goon
Moon Ska Europe profile of Lubby Nugget

Shootin' Goon albums